St. Mary Church is an ancient Assyrian church located in the city of Urmia, West Azerbaijan Province, Iran.

Current old building of the church belongs to Sasanian era and its interior design is a combination of Sasanian and Arsacid architecture.

A Chinese princess, who contributed to its reconstruction in 642 AD, has her name engraved on a stone on the church wall. The famous Italian traveller Marco Polo also described the church in his visit.

Briefly prior to the World War I, it was converted by Russians to a Russian Orthodox church.

In early 1960s, the old church was restored and a modern church with a spire was built adjacent to the ancient church.

See also 
 Iranian Assyrians

References

Assyrian Church of the East churches
Assyrians in Iran
Church of the East in Iran
Buildings and structures in Urmia
Churches in Iran
Tourist attractions in Urmia